Sandro Loechelt (born 24 August 1995) is a German footballer who plays for Wormatia Worms as a midfielder.

References

External links
 
 

1995 births
Living people
German footballers
People from Kirchheimbolanden
Footballers from Rhineland-Palatinate
Association football midfielders
Wormatia Worms players
1. FSV Mainz 05 II players
SV Waldhof Mannheim players
3. Liga players
Regionalliga players
Oberliga (football) players